Tom Burrows (born 5 May 1985) is an English cricketer. He is a right-handed batsman and a wicketkeeper.

Born in Wokingham, he has played for Berkshire and Hampshire since his cricketing baptism in 2003. Burrows' first-class debut match in May 2005 against Kent he helped Shane Warne towards his maiden first-class century, making 42 from number eight in a stand of 131 with Warne, and two months later he debuted in Twenty20 cricket, but was not called upon to bat as Hampshire lost to Sussex by ten runs.

Despite playing a number of games when regular wicket-keeper Nic Pothas was injured in 2009, Burrows, along with two other young players, was released by Hampshire at the end of the 2009 season.  Burrows is now pursuing a career in law at Southampton law firm Paris Smith LLP, having gained a first-class honours degree.

References

1985 births
Living people
English cricketers
Hampshire cricketers
People from Wokingham
Berkshire cricketers
Wicket-keepers